Amphimachairodus is an extinct genus of large machairodonts. It is also a member of the tribe Homotherini within Machairodontinae and is most closely related to such species as Xenosmilus, Homotherium itself, and Nimravides. It inhabited Eurasia, Northern Africa and North America during the late Miocene epoch.

Description
 
There was marked sexual dimorphism in A. giganteus, with males being much larger than females.

All Amphimachairodus species have a developed mandibular flange, however, A. colaradensis is distinguishable from A. giganteus and A. kurteni by subtle differences in the shape of the mandible and placement of lower carnassials.
This would make it comparable in size to Xenosmilus, Machairodus horribillis and slightly smaller than Smilodon populator. In 2022, this species was proposed to be reassigned to a separate genus, called Adeilosmilus.

Its legs were too short to sustain a long chase, but it most likely was a good jumper. It probably used its canines to cut open the throat of its prey, severing the major arteries and possibly crushing the windpipe. Its teeth were rooted to its mouth and were not as delicate as those of most other saber-toothed cats of the time, which had extremely long canines that hung out of their mouths. The fangs of Amphimachairodus, however, were able to easily fit in its mouth comfortably while being long enough to be effective for hunting. Amphimachairodus also possessed a longer tail than most other large machairodont genera.

Skull
Deformation of the skull through natural fossilization processes has changed the shape slightly, making it asymmetrical, but overall it remains an excellent specimen for studying the cranial morphology of this particular genus and species.

For felines, this skull is rather long, but rivaled by the skulls of the two largest species of extant cats: the lion and tiger. When compared with the skull of a regular lion, it is long and very narrow, particularly in the muzzle and width of the zygomatic arches. Its sagittal crest is well pronounced. Compared with other machairodonts, the canines are stout and capable of large amounts of stress. This characteristic is slightly remodeled in females, whose canines are slimmer and generally longer. Compared with females, the orbit of males are smaller, muzzles larger, the anterior-most portion of the nasal bones generally flare upwards slightly, and the downward slope of the dorsal edge of the skull in front of the orbit is not as pronounced, producing a straighter profile. Compared with the most well known machairodont Smilodon, commonly referred to as the "saber-toothed cat", the canines are much shorter, the facial portion again is much longer, and the teeth not reduced so far in number. Several machairodonts, namely Megantereon, bear flanges on the mandible, which are very reduced in A. giganteus though characteristics of the mandible associated with the flanges are present, particularly the lateral flattening of the anterior portion of the mandible, creating a cross section more square than semi-circular.

Paleoecology 

Amphimachairodus was an inhabitant of woodlands and open floodplains as based on finds in Pikermi in Greece and Shanxi Province in China, indicating it had habitat preferences similar to modern lions in many respects. Specimens recovered from Turolian deposits  indicate that the fauna living there was much the same, differing only by species in many cases. 
Among the creatures it shared its environment with were bovids such as Parabos, Lutung monkeys, the mastodon Anancus, the rhino Aceratherium, antelopes such as Tragoportax and Miotragocerus as well as gazelles and deer, a very large species of hyrax, early goats, various giraffes, camels such as Paracamelus, the horse Hipparion, a species of aardvark, the chalicothere Ancylotherium and the beaver-like Dipoides.
Other carnivores it shared its territory with include the percrocutid Dinocrocuta, the bear Agriotherium, fellow machairodonts Metailurus and Paramachairodus and hyenas like Thalassictis.

The larger herbivores were likely common prey for Amphimachairodus, and it likely would have competed with Agriotherium for food, possibly  yielding kills to the bear and possibly also stealing kills from hyenas such as Thalassictis and from Metailurus when the opportunity arose.

In North America, in places such as Coffee Ranch in Texas, Amphimachairodus coloradensis shared territory with Agriotherium as it had in Africa and Eurasia, but also shared territory with the feliform Barbourofelis and the canids Epicyon and Borophagus, and herbivores like the camel Aepycamelus, the pronghorn antelope Cosoryx, horses like Neohipparion and Nannippus, the peccary Prosthennops and rhinoceroses like Teleoceras.

In the Djurab desert in northern Chad, Amphimachairodus kabir co-existed with fellow machairodonts Lokotunjailurus, Tchadailurus and early representatives of the genus Megantereon. In addition, animals such as crocodiles, three-toed horses, fish, monkeys, hippos, aardvarks, turtles, rodents, giraffes, snakes, antelopes, pigs, mongooses, foxes, hyenas, otters, honey badgers and the hominid Sahelanthropus dwelled here, providing ample food. Based on these and other fossils, it is theorized that the Djurab was once the shore of a lake, generally forested close to the shore with savannah-like areas some distance away. The great number of cat species in the environment indicates that there was significant prey and available niches for multiple species of large felids to coexist.

See also
 Big cat
 List of largest carnivorans
 List of largest prehistoric carnivorans
 Megafauna
 Miocene
 Quaternary extinction event

References

Homotherini
Miocene mammals of Europe
Miocene mammals of Africa
Miocene mammals of Asia
Miocene mammals of North America
Fossil taxa described in 1929
Prehistoric carnivoran genera